47 Palace Court is a Grade II listed building at Palace Court, Bayswater, London, W2.

It was built in about 1890, and the architect was Leonard Stokes. There is a blue plaque to the writer Alice Meynell, who lived there.

References

Houses completed in 1890
Grade II listed houses in London
Bayswater
Houses in the City of Westminster
Grade II listed buildings in the City of Westminster